Prilipkinsky is a rural locality (a khutor) in Otrozhkinskoye Rural Settlement, Serafimovichsky District, Volgograd Oblast, Russia. The population was 67 as of 2010. There are 5 streets.

Geography 
Prilipkinsky is located 89 km northeast of Serafimovich (the district's administrative centre) by road. Ostrozhki is the nearest rural locality.

References 

Rural localities in Serafimovichsky District